The Democratic Progressive Party (PPD) was a Spanish political party created in 1879. It was joined by elements from the Republican Reformist Party, led by Cristino Martos, ahead of the 1879 Spanish general election.

In 1882 it dissolved and its members joined the Possibilist Democratic Party and the Dynastic Left.

See also
Liberalism and radicalism in Spain

References

Defunct political parties in Spain
Defunct liberal political parties
Political parties established in 1879
Political parties disestablished in 1882
1879 establishments in Spain
1882 disestablishments in Spain